This is a list of tornadoes which have been officially or unofficially labeled as F4, EF4, IF4, or an equivalent rating. These scales – the Fujita scale, the Enhanced Fujita scale, the International Fujita scale, and the TORRO tornado intensity scale – attempt to estimate the intensity of a tornado by classifying the damage caused to natural features and man-made structures in the tornado's path.

Tornadoes are among the most violent known meteorological phenomena. Each year, more than 2,000 tornadoes are recorded worldwide, with the vast majority occurring in North America and Europe. In order to assess the intensity of these events, meteorologist Ted Fujita devised a method to estimate maximum wind speeds within tornadic storms based on the damage caused; this became known as the Fujita scale. The scale ranks tornadoes from F0 to F5, with F0 being the least intense and F5 being the most intense.

Following two particularly devastating tornadoes in 1997 and 1999, engineers questioned the reliability of the Fujita scale. Ultimately, a new scale was devised that took into account 28 different damage indicators; this became known as the Enhanced Fujita scale. The Enhanced Fujita scale is used predominantly in North America. Most of Europe, on the other hand, uses the TORRO tornado intensity scale (or T-Scale), which ranks tornado intensity between T0 and T11; F4/EF4 tornadoes are approximately equivalent to T8 to T9 on the T-Scale. Tornadoes rated IF4 on the International Fujita scale are also included on this list.

List of F4/EF4 tornadoes 
The most recent EF4 tornado occurred on November 4, 2022, impacting areas near Clarksville, Texas, and Idabel, Oklahoma.

Pre-1950
The National Weather Service in the United States did not rate any tornadoes prior to 1950. Other organizations like the European Severe Storms Laboratory (ESSL) and Environment and Climate Change Canada (ECCC) on the other hand, did rate tornadoes prior to 1950. The only violent tornado that impacted the United States prior to 1950 and has an official rating is the 1946 Windsor–Tecumseh tornado, which received a rating from ECCC. However, the impact to the United States remains officially unrated.

1950s

1960s

1970s

1980s

1990s

2000s

2010s
 See List of F4 and EF4 tornadoes (2010–2019)

2020s
 See List of F4 and EF4 tornadoes (2020–present)

Possible F4/EF4 tornadoes with no official rating or lower rating
Because the distinctions between tornadoes ratings are often ambiguous, the official ratings of numerous other tornadoes formally rated below F4/EF4/IF4 or equivalent have been disputed, with certain government sources or independent studies contradicting the official record. This list includes tornadoes rated F4/EF4/IF4 or equivalent by government meteorologists, non-government tornado experts (i.e. Thomas P. Grazulis or Ted Fujita) or meteorological research institutions (i.e. European Severe Storms Laboratory) that rated a tornado differently than the official government organization in charge of the rating. Published academic papers or presentations at academically held meteorological conferences that rate tornadoes as F4/EF4/IF4 or present some evidence to support damage or winds in that category are also ways a tornado can be added to this list.

1870s
Tornado expert Thomas P. Grazulis gave F4 ratings to 48 tornadoes that occurred in the United States in the 1870s.

1880s
Grazulis gave F4 ratings to 70 tornadoes that occurred in the United States in the 1880s, and noted one other tornado that might have caused F4 damage.

1890s

1910s

1920s

1940s

1950–present

See also 
 List of North American tornadoes and tornado outbreaks
 List of F5 and EF5 tornadoes

Notes

References

Sources

 
Tornado-related lists